Carson Christopher Klein (born February 1, 2002) is an American soccer player.

Career

Youth
Klein joined the LA Galaxy academy in 2016, where he played until 2020. In 2020, Klein also played with LA Galaxy's USL Championship affiliate LA Galaxy II. He first appeared for the team on August 19, 2020, as a 78th-minute substitute during a 4–1 loss to Phoenix Rising.

College
In July 2020, Klein committed to playing college soccer at California Polytechnic State University in the fall of 2020.

Personal life
Carson is the son of Chris Klein, who played professional soccer for Kansas City Wizards, Real Salt Lake and LA Galaxy, as well as earning 22 caps for the United States national team. Chris also currently serves as President of LA Galaxy, a position he's held since 2013.

References

External links
 Cal Poly Mustangs bio

2002 births
Living people
American soccer players
Cal Poly Mustangs men's soccer players
LA Galaxy players
LA Galaxy II players
Association football forwards
Soccer players from California
USL Championship players
Sportspeople from Newport Beach, California